Rebling is a surname, likely of German origin. Notable people with the surname include:

Eberhard Rebling (1911-2008), German pianist, musicologist, dance scholar, and anti-fascist
Jalda Rebling (born 1951), German hazzan
Kathinka Rebling (1941-2020), German violonist and musicologist